A green sport event is a sporting event that stresses utilizing greener resources. Fans can do their part by riding public transportation to the event. People are being more aware of many things, like using earth friendly paper products, fertilizer and pesticides. Also see sustainable event management or event greening.

Third dimension

One week after the International Olympic Committee (IOC) awarded the XVII Olympic Winter Games to Lillehammer, national, local and regional governments decided to make the Lillehammer Games a showcase for GREEN mega-events. More than 200 different projects with environmental aspects were carried out. And at IOC's 100 years celebration in Paris in 1994, environment was added as the Third Dimension to the Olympics in addition to Sport and Culture.

The legacy from Lillehammer has, in a global perspective, followed two paths:
- World Conferences on sport and environment, the first in Lillehammer in 1996
- Environmental requirements which have to be met by future bidders and organisers of Olympic Games.

Green sports venues

Target Center

The Target Center home of the Minnesota Timberwolves (NBA) has the 5th largest green roof, and if the first arena to have a green roof. It collects rain water and regulates temperatures in both the summer and the winter. It has collected nearly 1 million gallons of rain water and it has diverted it into the Mississippi River. Also on the top of the roof there are different kinds of plants such as prairie coreopsis, wild strawberry, dotted blazing-star, and lupine.

Tokyo 2016 Olympics bid
 
Tokyo is not going to be the host of the 2016 olympics but the city was a candidate. They had said that if they were going to host it they would have the first carbon-minus games. A man-made island called Sea Forest off the Tokyo was going to be the place for the Olympic Cross-Country, Rowing, Canoe, Kayak and mountain bike and BMX competitions. Also they were going to have half a million trees planted on this island by 2016. U2's lead singer Bono was one of the first people to plant a tree on this island. During this major planning stage was also the Vice Governor of Tokyo, Hideo Sugawara, Beijing 2008 swimming medallist, Junichi Miyashita, and thousands of Tokyo 2016 green supporters. Tokyo's carbon-minus plan was to install the use of solar, wind and other renewable energy sources. They were going to have faculty helping where ever they could all over the stadium. Low or zero-emission vehicles are also includes in Tokyo 2016's plan.

American Airlines Center 

The American Airlines Center home of the Miami Heat (NBA) has been awarded LEED Certification for Existing Buildings: Operations & Maintenance by the U.S. Green Building Council (USGBC), being one of two the first two to receive this award. The center received the award on the same day as the Philips Arena in Atlanta. This center has committed to saving energy and water savings. They wish that they could be a lead to other sports venues becoming more "green" too.

List of "green" features at the American Airline Center 
Green roofing materials: The arena’s solar reflective index is high enough that it reflects heat and reduces the energy needed to cool the building.
Energy consumption: The arena was built without a chilled water plant, which requires a lot of energy, therefore, there is much less energy consumption as the arena’s chilled water comes from an off-site source.
 Water-efficient landscaping: All plants are high to medium drought resistant, and a “drip and soak” irrigation system (micro irrigation) runs under the surface delivering water directly to the roots and minimizing the amount of water evaporated by the sun.
Underground parking: Reduces heat-trapping asphalt to trap heat, which is known to cause a “heat-island effect” which releases heat back into the atmosphere.
Walk-off carpets: Trap dirt and contamination of arena guests to improve overall indoor air quality.

America Recycles Day

America Recycles Day (ARD) is the only nationally recognized day dedicated to encouraging Americans to recycle and buy recycled products. ARD is celebrated November 15. Hundreds of events are held across the U.S. to raise awareness about the importance of recycling and to encourage Americans to sign personal pledges to recycle and buy recycled products.

Recycling statistics
Source
251 million – tons of trash in the United States
82 million – tons of materials recycled in the United States
53.4 – percentage of all paper products recycled in the United States
32.5 – percentage of total waste that is recycled in the United States
100 – approximate percentage of increase in total recycling in the United States during the past decade
8,660 – number of curbside recycling programs in the United States in 2006
8,875 – number of curbside recycling programs in the United States in 2003
95 – percentage of energy saved by recycling an aluminum can, compared with manufacturing a new one
4.6 – pounds of trash per person per day in the United States (most in the world)
1.5 – pounds of recycled materials per person per day in the United States

See also 
Game Day Recycling
Miami Heat
Minnesota Timberwolves
Recycling
Recycling in the United States
Tokyo bid for the 2016 Summer Olympics
X games

References 

Recycling in the United States
Recycling